The Ministry of Tourism, Trade and Industry (MTCI;) is the government department of East Timor accountable for tourism, trade, industry and related matters.

Functions
The Ministry is responsible for the design, implementation, coordination and evaluation of policy for the areas of tourism, and commercial and industrial economic activities.

Minister
The incumbent Minister of Tourism, Trade and Industry is José Lucas do Carmo da Silva. He is assisted by Inácia da Conceição Teixeira, Deputy Minister of Minister of Community and Cultural Tourism, and Domingos Lopes Antunes, Deputy Minister of Trade and Industry.

See also 
 List of tourism ministries
 List of trade and industry ministries
 Politics of East Timor

References

Footnote

Notes

External links

  – official site 

Tourism, Trade and Industry
East Timor
East Timor
East Timor
East Timor, Tourism, Trade and Industry
East Timor, Tourism, Trade and Industry
1975 establishments in East Timor
2007 establishments in East Timor